The Robert Gardner Jr. House, in Millcreek, Utah, was listed on the National Register of Historic Places in 2018 and is located at 1475 E. Murphy's Ln. in Millcreek.

Built in 1848, is likely the oldest standing European American structure in the state of Utah, dating to the year of the Mexican cession of the Alta California region to the United States following the Mexican-American War.

Robert Gardner Jr. was born in Scotland and kept a journal during his time in Utah which survives.

See also
List of the oldest buildings in Utah

References

National Register of Historic Places in Salt Lake County, Utah
Queen Anne architecture in Utah
Houses completed in 1898
Buildings and structures in Millcreek, Utah
Houses in Salt Lake County, Utah